Bénédictine is a herbal liqueur produced in France. It was developed by wine merchant Alexandre Le Grand in the 19th century, and is reputedly flavored with twenty-seven flowers, berries, herbs, roots, and spices. 

A drier version, B&B, blending Bénédictine with brandy, was developed in the 1930s.

History
 

In 1863 Alexandre Le Grand developed a recipe for an herbal liqueur, helped by a local chemist, from old medicinal recipes that he had acquired from a religious foundation where a maternal grandparent had held office as a fiscal prosecutor. To market it, he embellished a story of it having been developed by monks at the Benedictine Abbey of Fécamp in Normandy, and produced by them until the abbey's devastation during the French Revolution. He began production under the trade name "Bénédictine", using a bottle with a distinguishing shape and label. To reinforce his myth, he placed the abbreviation "D.O.M." on the label, for "" ("To God, most good, most great"), used at the beginning of documents by the Benedictine Order to dedicate their work.

The liquor was mentioned in the 1948 RKO Pictures movie, “The Bishops Wife”, of three “Benedictines” drinks being ordered at a French restaurant by the Angel, “Dudley” (Cary Grant), then the order was changed to “Stingers” for the three nosey women with the cathedral board.

In 1982 just 15% of the production of the liqueur was sold in France with 45% of the product going to the United States of America. Benedictine is sold in over two hundred markets. The United Kingdom remains a significant market in Europe where much of the Bénédictine is consumed in the Burnley area of England. This is as a result of returning Great War soldiers of the East Lancashire Regiment acquiring a taste for the drink while stationed in France during the War. Traditionally people in East Lancashire drink Bénédictine with hot water, known as "Bene 'n' 'ot", and the Burnley Miners Club is reputedly the largest single customer. The abbey at Fécamp was used for a convalescence hospital.

In 1986, the Martini & Rossi group took control of Bénédictine. In 1992 they in turn were bought out by Bacardi for a reported $1.4 billion.

By 2010 around 75% of the production was exported. This marked a significant increase in its popularity in France. The biggest consumers of Bénédictine are the United States, Malaysia and Singapore.

Recipe
 

The recipe is a closely guarded trade secret, purportedly known to only three people at any given time. So many people have tried to reproduce it that the company maintains on its grounds in Fécamp a "Hall of Counterfeits" (Salle des Contrefaçons). The bottle and label have been imitated, as has the name Bénédictine. The company prosecutes those it feels are infringing on its intellectual property.

The manufacturing process involves several distillations which are then blended. The recipe of Bénédictine is a commercial secret, but it is known to contain 27 herbs and spices, of which the following 21 are publicly known: angelica, hyssop, juniper, myrrh, saffron, mace, fir cones, aloe, arnica, lemon balm, tea, thyme, coriander, clove, lemon, vanilla, orange peel, honey, red berries, cinnamon, and nutmeg.

Other products
The same company also produces "B & B" (or Bénédictine and Brandy), developed in the 1930s in response to a shift in taste toward drier (less sweet) liqueurs, simply by blending Bénédictine with brandy. Originally both products were 43% alcohol by volume (86 proof), but are now 40% alcohol (80 proof).

In 1977 the company introduced a 30% alcohol (60 proof) coffee liqueur which was called Café Bénédictine, a blend of Bénédictine and a coffee-flavoured liqueur, but it has been discontinued. The company also produces Bénédictine Single Cask, which comes in a unique black bottle and is only available at the Palais de la Bénédictine's store in Fécamp, Normandy, France.

References

Further reading
Harold J. Grossman and Harriet Lembeck, Grossman's Guide to Wines, Beers and Spirits (6th edition). Charles Scribner's Sons, New York, 1977, pp. 377–8. 
Jean Pierre Lantaz, Bénédictine, d'un alambic à cinq continents, éditions Bertout 1991.
Stéphane Nappez, Le palais Bénédictine, éditions PTC 2005

External links
Official site
Palais Bénédictine, official site

French liqueurs
Herbal liqueurs
Honey liqueurs and spirits
Norman cuisine
Bacardi